Venkatesh Harinathan is an Indian actor, who appears in Tamil cinema (Kollywood).

Career
Venkatesh made his acting careers in Stage Plays. He belongs to Chennai-based theater group Stray Factory and also appeared in various Television Commercials. Venkatesh made his film debut in Tamil film Irandaam Ulagam. He acted in key roles in Sutta Kadhai and Moone Moonu Varthai. He also translated and starred in Maya from Madurai, written by Naren Weiss and directed by Pooja Devariya.

Filmography
All films are in Tamil, unless otherwise noted.

References

External links

Male actors from Tamil Nadu
Year of birth missing (living people)
Living people
Tamil male actors
Tamil comedians